My Own is the second studio album by American rapper Young Bleed. It was released on October 19, 1999, through Priority Records. Recording sessions took place at Bluff Road Recording Studio in Baton Rouge, Louisiana. Production was handled by Steve Below, Happy Perez, Carlos "Big Los" Wilkerson, KC Easterwood, and Young Bleed himself, who also served as executive producer together with Paul "Uncle Pauly" Franklin. It features guest appearances from Jennifer Brumfield, Gram, Daz Dillinger, Lay-Lo, Lucky Knuckles and Too $hort. The album peaked at number 61 on the Billboard 200 and number 17 on the Top R&B/Hip-Hop Albums in the United States.

Critical reception
Soren Baker of Los Angeles Times wrote that Young Bleed "masterfully mixes tales of underclass struggle with stories of spiritual awakening … these soul-stirring, bouncy rhythms are built on thick bass guitar licks, chilling piano chords, airy keyboard patterns and choice background vocals".

Track listing

Sample credits
Track 2 contains elements from "The Blind Man" by New Birth
Track 6 contains elements from "Love to the People" by Curtis Mayfield

Personnel
Glenn "Young Bleed" Clifton Jr. – main artist, producer (track 2), executive producer
Todd "Too $hort" Shaw – vocals (track 4)
Graham "Gram" Love – vocals (tracks: 5, 12)
Jennifer Brumfield – vocals (tracks: 5, 12)
Delmar "Daz Dillinger" Arnaud – vocals (track 6)
Chad "Max Minelli" Roussel – vocals (track 6)
J-Von – vocals (tracks: 6, 10)
Lucky Knuckles – vocals (track 10)
Shawn Griffin – guitar (track 2), bass guitar (track 6)
Steve D. Below – producer (tracks: 1, 3, 6, 9, 12)
Nathan "Happy" Perez – producer (tracks: 4, 5, 10, 11)
Carlos "Big Los" Wilkerson – producer (track 7)
Kevin Easterwood Sr. – producer (track 8)
Mark Williams – engineering, mixing
Brian "Big Bass" Gardner – mastering
Paul "Uncle Pauly" Franklin – executive producer
Pen & Pixel Graphics – artwork, design
Duffy Rich – A&R
Kevin Faist – A&R

Charts

References

External links

1999 albums
Young Bleed albums
Priority Records albums
Albums produced by Happy Perez